Adam Tyler may refer to:

Adam Tyler, musician in Electrovamp
Adam Tyler, character in They Walk Among Us
Adam Tyler (screenwriter) on Haywire (TV series)